Awaji Nichiken (淡路日賢, 1243–1338) was a disciple of Nichiren who studied under Nichigen and founded Honjoji (本成寺) in Sanjō, Niigata in 1309. He was granted mandala 52 of the Nichiren Shonin Gohonzon Catalogue.

References

1243 births
1338 deaths
Japanese Buddhist clergy
Nichiren Buddhism
Nichiren Buddhist monks